Morgane, the Enchantress (French: Morgane la sirène) is a 1928 French silent drama film directed by Léonce Perret and starring Claire de Lorez, Iván Petrovich and Pierre Renoir. It was shot at the Victorine Studios in Nice. The film's sets were designed by the art director Jacques-Laurent Atthalin. The future British director Michael Powell worked as a still photographer on the film.

Cast
 Claire de Lorez as Morgane 
 Iván Petrovich as Georges de Kerduel 
 Josyane as Annette Le Foulon
 Georges Charlia
 Damorès as Le Foulon - Bankier 
 Flore Deschamps
 Rachel Devirys as Madame Le Foulon 
 Félix Dupont
 André Liabel
 Alexandre Mathillon
 Pierre Renoir
 Alice Tissot
 Georges Térof

References

Bibliography
 Rège, Philippe. Encyclopedia of French Film Directors, Volume 1. Scarecrow Press, 2009.

External links

1928 films
Films directed by Léonce Perret
French silent feature films
French drama films
1928 drama films
French black-and-white films
Silent drama films
1920s French films
Films shot at Victorine Studios